Belvidere  is a city in Boone County, settled on the Kishwaukee River in far northern Illinois, United States. Known as the 'City of Murals', Belvidere is home to several public art installations throughout the North and South State Street historic districts, which are on the national register of historic places. These historic districts are home to places like the Boone County Museum of History, The Funderburg Museum, several restaurants and bars, antique stores and Boutique stores. Popular festivities like Heritage Days are held yearly. The population was 25,339 as of the 2020 census. It is the county seat of Boone County. Belvidere is part of the Rockford, Illinois Metropolitan Statistical Area.

Geography

Belvidere developed on both sides of the Kishwaukee River in north central Illinois. It is 76 miles from downtown Chicago on Routes 20, 76 and the Northern Illinois Toll road. Belvidere is an industrial community surrounded by prosperous farms.  It is the County Seat with an estimated 2006 county population of over 52,000. The altitude is 800 feet above sea level, average temperatures are: 73 degrees F in the summer; 24 degrees F in the winter, and the average rainfall is 33.3 inches, and the average annual snowfall is 35.3 inches.

Demographics

As of the 2020 census there were 25,339 people, 8,940 households, and 5,891 families residing in the city. The racial makeup of the city was 61.76% White, 3.00% African American, 1.48% Native American, 1.09% Asian, 0.07% Pacific Islander, 18.15% from other races, and 14.46% from two or more races. Hispanic or Latino of any race were 35.91% of the population.

There were 8,940 households, out of which 55.79% had children under the age of 18 living with them, 42.39% were married couples living together, 16.40% had a female householder with no husband present, and 34.11% were non-families. 28.40% of all households were made up of individuals, and 16.31% had someone living alone who was 65 years of age or older. The average household size was 3.38 and the average family size was 2.76.

The city's age distribution consisted of 24.2% under the age of 18, 10.2% from 18 to 24, 25.2% from 25 to 44, 25.5% from 45 to 64, and 14.8% who were 65 years of age or older. The median age was 36.4 years. For every 100 females, there were 94.8 males. For every 100 females age 18 and over, there were 97.3 males.

The median income for a household in the city was $52,609, and the median income for a family was $67,518. Males had a median income of $34,455 versus $27,676 for females. The per capita income for the city was $24,330. About 8.9% of families and 13.5% of the population were below the poverty line, including 18.7% of those under age 18 and 9.7% of those age 65 or over.

Note: the US Census treats Hispanic/Latino as an ethnic category. This table excludes Latinos from the racial categories and assigns them to a separate category. Hispanics/Latinos can be of any race.

History

Before the arrival of the mostly Anglo-Americans in the 19th century, this area was long occupied by the Illinois Confederation, a loose grouping of up to 12 to 15 Native American tribes. The main tribes were the Cahokia, Kaskaskia, Michigamea, Peoria, and Tamaroa. After trading, warfare and other encounters with French traders, who entered this area before the Anglo-Americans, their numbers declined. In large part that was due to the high mortality from new infectious diseases, which adversely affected Native Americans across the continent.

The area that developed as Belvidere was first permanently settled by European Americans in 1835: Simon P. Doty and Daniel Hilton Whitney. They named this location next to the Kishwaukee River as "Elysian Fields" from Greek mythology. As many new residents could not pronounce or spell the proposed name, the city was eventually named after Belvidere, Virginia, the former home of Ebenezer Polk, a railroad lawyer and major financial founder in the city.  

Belvidere originally developed on the north side of the Kishwaukee River.  In 1851 the Galena and Chicago Union Railroad was built south of the river, stimulating relocation of much of the business section to the south side of the river, for access to the railway transportion. Belvidere's downtown is now on the south side. 

Major industries developed along the river and railroad, including the National Sewing Machine Company, which operated here from 1886 to the 1940s. In 1906, former female sheriff Sarah Ames moved to South Dakota; she named the area where she settled after her home town. Belvidere, South Dakota still operates as a small town in Jackson County.

1967 tornado

On April 21, 1967, a devastating tornado struck Belvidere. Twenty-four people died as a result, many of them schoolchildren. The F4 tornado struck at the end of the school day of Belvidere High School, when many children, including those who attended area grade schools, were waiting outside the high school for school buses. Of the sixteen school buses outside the high school, twelve were overturned or thrown by the tornado.  The tornado did $22 million in damage, demolished over 100 homes, and injured 500 people. In 2007 a statue was erected in front of Belvidere High School in memorial of the lives lost.

To this date, the Belvidere tornado remains the 6th worst weather disaster to happen at an American School.

2009 explosion
On December 7, 2009 an explosion occurred at an NDK America building, when a large pressure vessel ruptured during a crystal-growing process. Pieces of debris, some weighing several tons, were flung over a wide area. One piece struck an automotive supply building and injured an employee inside. Chesterfield native Ronald Greenfield, a truck driver refueling at the nearby Belvidere Oasis truck stop, was struck and killed by a 7-foot support beam. The shockwave was felt over a wide area. No NDK employees were injured in the incident.  

The Chemical Safety Board investigated the incident, issuing their final report in 2013. The CSB found that stress corrosion cracking had occurred, unnoticed, in one of the crystal-growing autoclaves, leading to the catastrophic failure. They also found that NDK management had been warned multiple times over the years that the dangerous levels of hot sodium hydroxide inside the vessels would corrode the steel walls. However, NDK management insisted buildup of byproducts from the crystal-growing process would form a protective layer against the corrosion. Furthermore, during the factory's construction, the local government had been made aware that NDK's crystal-growing vessels were in violation of several state codes; when confronted, NDK had persuaded them to grant a special exception, and to hitherto allow them to conduct their own onsite inspections without outside interference. However, the vessel that ruptured had never been internally inspected to test the "byproduct buildup" theory, during its many years of service. After a smaller leak occurred in January 2007, NDK was warned about safety concerns again, this time by insurance investigators, who were ultimately ignored. Finally, the CSB determined the method for growing crystals used at NDK's Belvidere facility was prohibitively dangerous in the first place, pointing out such methods had been already abandoned by other crystal-growing facilities in favor of safer, lower-pressure and lower temperature processes. 

Following their own 2010 investigation, the Occupational Safety and Health Administration fined NDK more than half a million dollars for willful disregard for legal requirements, and "unacceptable" indifference to safety and health. The NDK facility was demolished in 2015, with no plans to rebuild.

Culture
Pettit Memorial Chapel, designed by Frank Lloyd Wright; the Lampert-Wildflower House, and the Belvidere Post Office, designed by James Knox Taylor, are listed on the National Register of Historic Places. 

Parks include Spencer Park, Belvidere Municipal Park, and the Boone County Fairgrounds. Belvidere is known as the "City of Murals", for its numerous murals.

Representation in other media
The Left Behind series fictional character Rayford Steele was born here.

Services
Belvidere used to have two hospitals, St. Joseph Hospital and Highland Hospital. Both closed in the late 20th century, with St. Joseph's closing in 1999. In 2008, SwedishAmerican Hospital opened a new building. In 2009, they renovated and reopened the former Highland Hospital, which now operates the city's only emergency department. 

Cemeteries include the Belvidere Cemetery (Richard S. Molony's interment site) and St. James Catholic Cemetery. 

The nearest general aviation airport is Poplar Grove Airport, formerly known as Belvidere Airport.

Education
Schools include Belvidere High School, Belvidere North High School, Everest High School, Belvidere South Middle School, Belvidere Central Middle School, Lincoln Elementary School, Perry Elementary School, Meehan Elementary School, Caledonia Elementary School, Seth Whitman Elementary school, and one academy, Washington Academy which are all part of the Belvidere Community Unit School District 100. 

Belvidere's public library, Ida Public Library, was founded in 1883. The current building, a Carnegie Library, was constructed in 1912 and opened in 1913. An addition was built in 1987. It includes adult and children services, a Local History and Genealogy Room, and Internet/computer access.  

The Boone County Museum was started in 1936 and holds over 100,000 artifacts. It has interactive displays and a research library, with more than 5000 document resources. The three-story building is located in downtown Belvidere.

Business
Stellantis operates the Belvidere Assembly Plant, an auto assembly plant, which was constructed in the mid-1960s. The Belvidere plant manufactured the Dodge Neon until the spring of 2005. In the late 1960s and early 1970s, the plant manufactured Chrysler Newports and Plymouth Furys.  After a massive restructuring of the Belvidere plant, it is now one of the most modern auto assembly plants in the United States. It currently assembles the Jeep Cherokee until February of 2023, when this plant will be Idled indefinitely by Stellantis.

Dean Foods and General Mills operate manufacturing plants on the bank of the Kishwaukee River. General Mills recently announced a large expansion in the area, soon to begin construction on a 1.3 million square foot distribution center in a newly annexed southwestern portion of the city.  

Rock Valley college recently opened their new 9+ million dollar Advanced Technology Center in the northwestern portion of Belvidere, after competition between several area cities for the Advanced Technology Center.    

"Project Yukon" is a recently announced Cold Storage facility, which will be over 1.2 million square feet on 200 acres in the Southwest side of the city. This is expected to bring up to 700 jobs, ground is expected to be broken mid-2023

Notable people

 Frank Bishop, infielder for the Chicago Browns
 Emory S. Bogardus, sociologist
 Joe Charboneau, outfielder and designated hitter for the Cleveland Indians
 Judith Ford, 1969 Miss America
 Charles Eugene Fuller, U.S. Congressman
 Jeanne Gang award-winning architect, founder of Studio Gang Architects, and designer of the world’s two  tallest skyscrapers designed by a woman,  Aqua and the St. Regis Chicago
 Stephen Augustus Hurlbut (1815-1882), politician and Union commander in the Civil War, diplomat in postwar years; moved here in 1845, married and had a family, elected to the US Congress from here.
 Noyes L. Jackson, Illinois politician
 Lowell Holden Parker, Wisconsin legislator
 Amanda Levens, women's college basketball player and coach
 Fred Schulte, outfielder for the St. Louis Browns, Washington Senators and Pittsburgh Pirates
 Kurt Sellers, wrestler with the WWE (as K.C. James and James Curtis)
 James A. Slater, entomologist at the University of Connecticut
 Roger Charles Sullivan, Illinois politician
 Scott Taylor, professional off-road racing driver
 James Waddington, Wisconsin State Senator
Ronald A. Wait, Illinois State Representative

References

External links

 City of Belvidere Website
 

 
Cities in Boone County, Illinois
Cities in Illinois
County seats in Illinois
Populated places established in 1835
1881 establishments in Illinois